Jean-Pierre Pophillat (29 August 1938 – 19 September 2020) was a French painter and lithographer.

Biography
Born in Vichy, Pophillat spent the first nine years of his life in Lapalisse where his father was an assistant pharmacist and his mother was a piano teacher. He then moved to Le Raincy, where his parents became herbalists.

In 1957, Pophillat was admitted to the École nationale supérieure des Beaux-Arts in the studio of Roger Chapelain-Midy. He participated in an exhibition of young painters alongside Bernard Buffet, Maurice Boitel, Xavier Valls, Michel Henry, and Pierre-Henry. In 1964, he won the Prize of the Casa de Velásquez. Beginning in 1959, he participated in numerous groups, including the Salon d'Automne, of which he became a member in 1972. He was also a member of the Salon Comparaisons, the Société Nationale des Beaux-Arts, and the Salon des artistes français.

Pophillat painted at his properties in Cannes and Deauville with a bright and colorful style. He died in Paris on 19 September 2020 at the age of 83.

Personal Exhibitions
Galerie Vendôme, Paris (1977)
Château de la Bertrandière, L'Étrat (2011)
Gallery Bund 22, Shanghai (2014)
Ludwig Galerie, Saarlouis (2015)
Galerie Saint-Hubet, Lyon (2015)

Prizes
Prix Antral (1963)
Prix de la Casa Velásquez (1964)
Médaille d'or des artistes français (1970)
Prix de la Compagnie Transatlantique (1978)
Grand Prix du Salon de Colombes (1985)
Grand Prix de la ville de Blois (1987)
Grand Prix de la ville de Tours (1987)
Grand Prix de la ville de Nantes (1993)

References

1938 births
2020 deaths
20th-century French painters
French lithographers
People from Vichy
People from Allier
École Normale Supérieure alumni
21st-century French painters